Changsha railway station is a railway station and a metro station on the Beijing–Guangzhou railway and the Changsha–Zhuzhou–Xiangtan intercity railway. The station is located in Furong District, Changsha, Hunan, China. The station is served by Changsha Metro Line 2 and Line 3.

History
The station opened in 1912, and was re-constructed in 1977.

Services

China Railway

Changsha railway station is a railway station in Furong District, Changsha, Hunan, China, operated by CR Guangzhou Group. It opened its services on 1912.

Changsha Metro

Railway Station is a metro station in Furong District, Changsha, Hunan, China, operated by the Changsha subway operator Changsha Metro. It opened its services on 29 April 2014.

Layout

Adjacent stations

References

Railway stations in Hunan
Railway stations in China opened in 1912
Transport in Changsha